Hillman Creek is a stream in Morrison County, in the U.S. state of Minnesota.

Hillman Creek bears the name of an early settler.

See also
List of rivers of Minnesota

References

Rivers of Morrison County, Minnesota
Rivers of Minnesota